A gubernatorial election was held on 24 June 2018 to elect the next governor of , a prefecture of Japan located in the Kansai region of Honshu island.

Candidates  

Taizo Mikazuki, incumbent since 2014, 47, ex-lawmaker of the DPJ, endorsed by DPFP, LDP, Komeito.
Manabu Kondo, 68, former Shiga University Vice President, endorsed by JCP.

Results

References 

2018 elections in Japan
Shiga gubernational elections
Politics of Shiga Prefecture
July 2018 events in Japan